Scott Lee Clemmensen (born July 23, 1977) is an American former professional ice hockey goaltender, who played with the New Jersey Devils, Toronto Maple Leafs and the Florida Panthers in the National Hockey League (NHL).

Playing career
A native of Urbandale, Iowa, Clemmensen was drafted by the New Jersey Devils in the 8th round, 215th overall, in the 1997 NHL Entry Draft after playing high school hockey with the Des Moines Capitals of the MHSHL, and then junior hockey with the Des Moines Buccaneers of the United States Hockey League (USHL). Upon being drafted, Clemmensen went on to play college hockey with the Boston College Eagles from 1997–2001, and won the NCAA National Championship with them as a senior. He played in four consecutive NCAA tournaments, reaching the Frozen Four all four years and the title game 3 of the 4 times. To this day, he holds the NCAA record for most career wins in the tournament, with 10 victories.

Turning pro in the 2001–02 season, Clemmensen made his NHL debut in New Jersey's season opener vs. the Washington Capitals and played  in two games for the Devils, while playing the majority of his professional rookie season with the Albany River Rats of the American Hockey League (AHL), the Devils' minor league affiliate. He remained for the following three seasons in Albany, competing with fellow Devils' goaltending prospect Ari Ahonen for starts. In 2003–04, Clemmensen was called up and appeared in four games for the Devils, posting a 1.01 goals against average (GAA). He received his first NHL start against the Pittsburgh Penguins on January 20, 2004, winning 3–0. In doing so, Clemmensen became the first player in the history of the National Hockey League to have been born in the state of Iowa.

Following the 2004–05 NHL lockout, Clemmensen became Martin Brodeur's permanent backup, appearing in 13 games (starting in 9) and posting a 3.35 GAA for the 2005–06 season. The following year, Clemmensen appeared in six games in relief of Brodeur, recording a 3.14 GAA. In the off-season, he became a free agent and after the Devils signed Kevin Weekes to back up Brodeur, Clemmensen signed a one-year, two-way contract with the Toronto Maple Leafs on July 6, 2007. He played the majority of the 2007–08 season splitting starts with Maple Leafs Justin Pogge with the Toronto Marlies of the AHL, while appearing in three games for the Maple Leafs. He made his first start with the Maple Leafs on January 1, 2008, as the result of an injury to starter Vesa Toskala, and recorded a 4–3 shootout win against the Tampa Bay Lightning. Going into the 2007 Calder Cup playoffs back with the Marlies, Clemmensen assumed the starting role over Pogge and helped the club to the Western Conference semi-finals against the Chicago Wolves, where they were eliminated in five games.

On July 10, 2008, Clemmensen returned to the New Jersey Devils, signing a one-year contract. He started the 2008–09 season with New Jersey's new AHL affiliate, the Lowell Devils. However, when Brodeur suffered a major injury early in the season, Clemmensen was called up to backup second-string goalie Kevin Weekes. However, as Weekes struggled in his early starts following Brodeur's injury, Clemmensen took over and started the majority of the games in Brodeur's absence. On February 25, 2009, Brodeur was taken off the injured reserve and Clemmensen was sent back to the Lowell Devils. In 40 games, Clemmensen posted a 25-13-1 record and two shutouts. His 25 wins are the highest total by a goaltender besides Brodeur in franchise history, while his 2.39 GAA and .917 save percentage were statistically in the league's top ten. He was awarded the Devils' Unsung Hero Award, as voted by his teammates, and was also selected as the Devils' nominee for the Bill Masterton Memorial Trophy, awarded for perseverance and sportsmanship. He was not, however, retained as one of the league's three finalists. In April 2009, Clemmensen was called up once again, this time to backup Brodeur for the 2009 playoffs after an injury to Weekes.

Clemmensen signed with the Florida Panthers on July 1, 2009.  On November 3, 2011, the Panthers loaned Clemmensen, who suffered a knee injury in the pre-season, to the San Antonio Rampage of the American Hockey League for conditioning purposes. He eventually reunited with former Devils teammate, John Madden in 2012, helping the Panthers clinch the playoffs for the first time in twelve years.

On July 1, 2014, Clemmensen returned to his original club, the New Jersey Devils as a free agent on a one-year contract. On June 30, 2015, Clemmensen ended his professional career but remained with the Devils in accepting a development goaltending coach role.

International play
On May 1, 2009, Clemmensen was selected to represent Team USA at the 2009 IIHF World Championships as the starting goalie. He also played for Team USA in the 2010 IIHF World Championships, posting two consecutive shutouts: a 10-0 win over Kazakhstan, which he shared with Ben Bishop, and a 4-0 victory against France.

Career statistics

Regular season and playoffs

International

Awards and honors

References

External links

Scott Clemmensen on HockeyGoalies.org

1977 births
Living people
Albany Devils players
Albany River Rats players
American men's ice hockey goaltenders
Boston College Eagles men's ice hockey players
Florida Panthers players
Ice hockey people from Iowa
Lowell Devils players
New Jersey Devils coaches
New Jersey Devils draft picks
New Jersey Devils players
People from Urbandale, Iowa
San Antonio Rampage players
Sportspeople from Des Moines, Iowa
Toronto Maple Leafs players
Toronto Marlies players
NCAA men's ice hockey national champions